Miray Bekbölet is a Turkish environmental chemist researching oxidation techniques, photocatalytic and photolytic reactions, adsorption/bio-oxidation processes in aquatic systems, and drinking water quality. She is a professor of environmental chemistry at the Boğaziçi University Institute of Environmental Sciences.

Education 
Miray Bekbölet completed a B.S. with high distinction in chemistry and physics at Ege University in 1973. In 1979, she earned a Ph.D. in food sciences at Ege University.

Career and research 
Bekbölet joined the faculty at Boğaziçi University in 1985 as an instructor in the Institute of Environmental Sciences. She was promoted to assistant professor in 1986, associate professor in 1991 and professor in 1997.

Bekbölet's researches oxidation techniques, photocatalytic and photolytic reactions, adsorption/bio-oxidation processes in aquatic systems, and drinking water quality.

References

External links
 

Year of birth missing (living people)
Place of birth missing (living people)
Environmental chemistry
Environmental scientists
Turkish women chemists
Turkish chemists
21st-century women scientists
20th-century women scientists
20th-century chemists
21st-century chemists
Photochemists
Ege University alumni
Academic staff of Boğaziçi University
Living people